Craig Osaikhwuwuomwan (born October 12, 1990) is a Dutch professional basketball player who last played for Armex Děčín. Osaikhwuwuomwan is a former member of the Dutch national basketball team.

Professional career
On August 3, 2010, Craig signed his first professional contract with ABC Amsterdam in the DBL. He averaged 3,6 points and 3,5 rebounds per game and eventually won the DBL Rookie of the Year award.

After the club from Amsterdam went bankrupt, Osaikhwuwuomwan signed with Magixx playing for KidsRights in Wijchen.

The following year, Osaikhwuwuomwan played for Aris Leeuwarden. With Leeuwarden, he reached the DBL Finals.

On May 31, 2013 he signed with GasTerra Flames. Osaikhwuwuomwan stayed there for the 2013–14 and 2014–15 season. In 2014 he won the DBL championship, in 2014 and 2015 he won the NBB Cup.

For the 2014–15 season, he signed with Landstede Basketbal.

On August 9, 2017, Osaikhwuwuomwan signed with Plymouth Raiders of the British Basketball League. He was released on September 11, after he did not pass the club's medical assessment.  

In the 2017–18 season, he played for BC Rustavi in Georgia. There, he averaged eight points and six rebounds per game, appearing 13 Superliga games.

On December 18, 2018, he returned to Aris Leeuwarden for the remainder of the 2018–19 season. He was released on March 3, 2021.

In the 2021–22 season, Osaikhwuwuomwan played for Armex Děčín in the Czech NBL, averaging 9.8 points and 6.8 rebounds in 16 games.

National team career 
Osaikhwuwuomwan played 19 games for the Netherlands men's national basketball team, after making his debut on 30 July 2011 in a game against Cyprus.

Awards and accomplishments
Donar
Dutch Basketball League: 2014
2× NBB Cup: 2014, 2015
Dutch Basketball Supercup: 2014
Individual
DBL Rookie of the Year: 2011

References

1990 births
Living people
Amsterdam Basketball players
Landstede Hammers players
Aris Leeuwarden players
Centers (basketball)
Donar (basketball club) players
Dutch Basketball League players
Dutch men's basketball players
Matrixx Magixx players
People from Cranendonck
Power forwards (basketball)
BC Rustavi players
BK Děčín players
BC Tallinn Kalev players
Dutch expatriate basketball people in Estonia
Dutch expatriate basketball people in Georgia (country)
Dutch expatriate basketball people in the Czech Republic
Dutch people of Nigerian descent